The Hughes 35 is a Canadian sailboat that was designed by Sparkman & Stephens as a cruiser-racer and first built in 1977.

The Hughes 35 is a development of the North Star 1500, which was built by North Star Yachts prior to Howard Hughes re-acquiring the company in 1977. Both the Hughes 35 and the North Star 35 are variants of Sparkman & Stephens's design number 2166 as are the Aura A35 and the SHE 36.

Production
The design was built by Hughes Boat Works in Canada, starting in 1977, but it is now out of production.

Design
The Hughes 35 is a recreational keelboat, built predominantly of fibreglass, with wood trim. It has a masthead sloop rig, a raked stem, a reverse transom a skeg-mounted rudder controlled by a wheel and a swept fixed fin keel. It displaces  and carries  of ballast.

See also
List of sailing boat types

Related development
 Aura A35
 North Star 1500
 SHE 36

References

External links
Photo of a Hughes 35 showing keel and rudder shape
Video tour of the Hughes 35

Keelboats
1970s sailboat type designs
Sailing yachts
Sailboat type designs by Sparkman and Stephens
Sailboat types built by Hughes Boat Works